Tronus Abyss is a cult "electro-apocalyptic" band from Italy. They started out in 1997 with a quite plain symphonic black metal album ("The King of Angel in the Abyss"), but in 1999 they recorded "Rotten Dark", an album crossing the boundaries of extreme music and redefining new styles. Rotten Dark was a mix of powerful black metal, industrial, medieval profane music, neoclassical and apocalyptic-folk.

History
In 2003, they redefined again their style with another extreme album called "Kampf". Labeling their style as "electro-apocalyptic", in Kampf they moved toward an electronic and bombastic style, yet obscure and malevolent. Definitely not an easy-listening record, the press defined Kampf as a true masterpiece due to his originality and revolutionary musical approach.
They also appear in "Visions - a Tribute to Burzum" original tribute album playing a martial-neofolk version of Moti Ragnarokum and in a Fluttering Dragon comp. called "Triumph des todes", along with other famous industrial bands, with a version of the track "Radio Europa" originally released on "Kampf".
In October 2008 they released their fourth album, which was titled "Vuoto Spazio Trionfo".

Tronus Abyss is considered a cult band in the so-called extreme scene. The founding members have always been involved in esoteric and cultural background activities flirting with Traditionalist topics (not political, but mostly related with Traditionalist esoteric philosophies and philosophers) and IIWW imagery in lyrics and aesthetics.

B. Malphas left the band to join the Post-Black Metal band Janvs in 2007, but rejoined Tronus Abyss in 2011.
The new lineup is currently working on the fifth album.

Members

Current members
 Atratus - Vocals
 B. Malphas - Synths, piano, machines, samples, programming, bass, acoustic guitar
 Mord - Guitar, machines, samples

Former Members
 Il Monaco - Keyboards
 Il Marchese - Bass
 Axion412 - Drums

Italian musical groups